The International Cosmos Prize was established in 1993, commemorating Expo '90 in Osaka, Japan. The objective of the prize was to develop the basic concept of Expo 90, "The Harmonious Coexistence between Nature and Mankind" and is awarded annually by the Commemorative Foundation for the International Garden and Greenery Exposition, Osaka, Japan, 1990 (Expo '90 Foundation).

The prize, which may be awarded to an individual or team, consists of a commendation, a medallion and a monetary reward, currently 40 million yen. It is awarded during a ceremony held in each autumn, at which the individual or team delivers a commemorative lecture and takes part in a symposium held in their honor.

The name of the prize, "Cosmos," refers to the Cosmos flower that bloomed during the Expo and the ancient Greek word kosmos meaning "universe in harmony." The prize was first awarded in 1993, to the then Director of the Royal Botanic Gardens, Kew, Sir Ghillean Prance.

Subject matter 
The prize shall be awarded for outstanding research work and/or achievement which promote the philosophy, "The Harmonious Coexistence between Nature and Mankind." The Prize shall also illuminate research and/or achievements that use not only analytical and reductive methods, but also advocate a global outlook and show integrated, long-term vision. The prize recognizes achievements in the natural and social sciences, humanities and the arts.

Selection procedure 
The Cosmos Prize Committee  will form the Screening Committee of Experts which will screen candidates recommended by the designated recommenders. Based on the results of the screening, the Cosmos Prize Committee will decide the Prizewinner.

Laureates
Source:  

1993 – Ghillean Prance
1994 – 
1995 – Tatsuo Kira
1996 –  George B. Schaller
1997 – Richard Dawkins
1998 – Jared M. Diamond
1999 – Wu Zhengyi
2000 – David Attenborough
2001 – Anne Whiston Spirn
2002 – Charles Darwin Research Station
2003 – Peter H. Raven
2004 – Julia Carabias Lillo
2005 – Daniel Pauly
2006 – Raman Sukumar
2007 – Georgina Mace
2008 – Phan Nguyên Hồng
2009 – Gretchen Cara Daily
2010 – Estella Leopold
2011 – The Scientific Steering Committee of the Census of Marine Life
2012 – Edward O. Wilson
2013 – Bob Paine
2014 – Philippe Descola
2015 – Johan Rockström
2016 – Kunio Iwatsuki
2017 – Jane Goodall
2018 – Augustin Berque
2019 – Stuart Pimm
2020 – Not awarded due to COVID-19
2021 – Peter Bellwood
2022 – Felicia Keesing

See also

 List of environmental awards
 List of social sciences awards

References 

Environmental awards
Environmental sciences awards
Japanese awards